A ewe is a female sheep. 

Ewe or EWE may also refer to:

Culture
 Ewe people, an ethnic group in the Eastern parts of Ghana, Benin and Togo
 Ewe language
 Ewe music

Geography
 Isle of Ewe, an island off the west coast of Scotland
 Loch Ewe, a sea loch in Scotland
 St Ewe, a village in Cornwall

People
 David Ewe, New Zealand rugby player

Transportation
 Eurowings Europe, an Austrian airline
 Ewell East railway station in Surrey, England
 Ewer Airport, in Indonesia

Other uses
 Ecopath with Ecosim, an ecological computer modelling system for fisheries
 EWE Baskets Oldenburg, a German basketball team
 Large EWE Arena in Oldenburg, Germany
 Small EWE Arena in Oldenburg, Germany

Language and nationality disambiguation pages